Crossgates Fife railway station co-served the village of Crossgates, Fife, Scotland, from 1848 to 1949 on the Edinburgh and Northern Railway.

History 
The station was opened as Crossgates on 4 September 1848 by the Edinburgh and Northern Railway. It was originally a terminus until  opened on 13 December 1849. The station building and the signal box were on the westbound platform and the goods yard was on the north side, which served Mossend Iron Foundry. The station's name was changed to Crossgates Fife on 1 July 1923 to avoid confusion with the station of the same name in Yorkshire. The station closed on 26 September 1949.

References 

Disused railway stations in Fife
Railway stations in Great Britain opened in 1848
Railway stations in Great Britain closed in 1949
1848 establishments in Scotland
1949 disestablishments in Scotland